There are sixty colleges and universities in the U.S. state of Iowa that are listed under the Carnegie Classification of Institutions of Higher Education. These institutions include two research universities, nine master's universities, and nineteen baccalaureate colleges, as well as twenty-one associate's colleges. In addition, eleven special-focus institutions and three baccalaureate/associate's colleges operate in the state. The Iowa Board of Regents, a governing board, oversees the state's three public universities – the University of Iowa, Iowa State University, and the University of Northern Iowa.

With 5,713 students, Upper Iowa University is the state's largest private not-for-profit school. The state's oldest post-secondary institution is Loras College, a private Catholic school in Dubuque that was founded in 1839, seven years before Iowa became a state.

The state's only two law schools, the University of Iowa College of Law and Drake University Law School, are both accredited by the American Bar Association. Roy J. and Lucille A. Carver College of Medicine and Des Moines University are the state's two medical schools. The majority of Iowa's post-secondary institutions are accredited by the Higher Learning Commission (HLC). Most are accredited by multiple agencies, such as the Commission on Collegiate Nursing Education (CCNE), the National Association of Schools of Music (NASM), and the National League for Nursing (NLNAC).

Extant institutions

Defunct institutions

Key

See also

 List of college athletic programs in Iowa
 Higher education in the United States
 Lists of American universities and colleges
 List of recognized higher education accreditation organizations

Notes

References

External links
U.S. Department of Education National Center for Education Statistics listing of accredited institutions in Iowa

Universities and colleges
Iowa, List of colleges and universities in